Stenostrophia tribalteata is a species of flower longhorn in the beetle family Cerambycidae. It is found in North America.

Subspecies
These three subspecies belong to the species Stenostrophia tribalteata:
 Stenostrophia tribalteata serpentina (Casey, 1891)
 Stenostrophia tribalteata sierrae Linsley & Chemsak, 1976
 Stenostrophia tribalteata tribalteata (LeConte, 1873)

References

Further reading

 
 

Lepturinae
Articles created by Qbugbot
Beetles described in 1873